Ötögön (formerly: Birikken) is a village in the Chüy Region of Kyrgyzstan. It is part of the Ysyk-Ata District. Its population was 982 in 2021. Nearby villages include Döng-Aryk, Kegeti, Stambek, Syn-Tash, and Yuryevka.

References

Populated places in Chüy Region